Matrosovo is a former air base on Sakhalin Island, Russia located 14 km north of Leonidovo.  It served as a dispersal airfield for military aircraft on Sakhalin Island during the Cold War.

Matrosovo was identified on Western Intelligence documents around 1962.  The Central Intelligence Agency's collection of declassified documents do not show that any aircraft were ever observed at this airfield, and no documents after 1970 reference the airfield.

In 1985 a Tupolev Tu-16 from Khorol crashed at or near this airfield.  Matrosovo was not used after the Cold War and has fallen into a state of decay.

References

RussianAirFields.com

Soviet Air Force bases